Bradley Singh  (born 20 April 1980) is a South African politician who has been serving as a Member of the KwaZulu-Natal Legislature since 22 May 2019. He is a member of the Democratic Alliance (DA).

Previously, Singh was an eThekwini ward councillor for the Minority Front (MF) until April 2014, when he joined the DA. A by-election was held in his ward in July 2014, which he won as the DA candidate. He was later re-elected as a ward councillor in August 2016.

References

External links
Bradley Singh – People's Assembly

Living people
Members of the KwaZulu-Natal Legislature
People from Durban
Democratic Alliance (South Africa) politicians
Minority Front politicians
South African people of Indian descent
1980 births